Silmsi Nature Reserve is a nature reserve which is located in Järva County, Estonia.

The area of the nature reserve is 146 ha.

The protected area was founded in 2005 to protect valuable habitat types and threatened species in Valila village (former Koeru Parish).

References

Nature reserves in Estonia
Geography of Järva County